Mohsin Ali is a professional track and field athlete from Pakistan who competes in the 110 metres hurdles.

He won the 110 m hurdles title at the 2010 South Asian Games in Dhaka. He represented Pakistan at the 2011 Asian Athletics Championships and took part in the 60 metres hurdles at the 2012 Asian Indoor Athletics Championships.

References

External links

1988 births
Living people
Pakistani male hurdlers
South Asian Games gold medalists for Pakistan
South Asian Games medalists in athletics
21st-century Pakistani people